The table of years in literature is a tabular display of all years in literature for overview and quick navigation to any year.

Contents: 2000s  ·1900s · 1800s · 1700s · 1600s · 1500s · 1400s · Other

2000s in literature
2000  2001  2002  2003  2004  2005  2006  2007  2008  2009  2010  2011  2012  2013  2014  2015  2016  2017  2018  2019
2020 2021 2022 2023

1900s in literature
1900  1901  1902  1903  1904  1905  1906  1907  1908  1909
1910  1911  1912  1913  1914  1915  1916  1917  1918  1919
1920  1921  1922  1923  1924  1925  1926  1927  1928  1929
1930  1931  1932  1933  1934  1935  1936  1937  1938  1939
1940  1941  1942  1943  1944  1945  1946  1947  1948  1949
1950  1951  1952  1953  1954  1955  1956  1957  1958  1959
1960  1961  1962  1963  1964  1965  1966  1967  1968  1969
1970  1971  1972  1973  1974  1975  1976  1977  1978  1979
1980  1981  1982  1983  1984  1985  1986  1987  1988  1989
1990  1991  1992  1993  1994  1995  1996  1997  1998  1999

1800s in literature
1800  1801  1802  1803  1804  1805  1806  1807  1808  1809
1810  1811  1812  1813  1814  1815  1816  1817  1818  1819
1820  1821  1822  1823  1824  1825  1826  1827  1828  1829
1830  1831  1832  1833  1834  1835  1836  1837  1838  1839
1840  1841  1842  1843  1844  1845  1846  1847  1848  1849
1850  1851  1852  1853  1854  1855  1856  1857  1858  1859
1860  1861  1862  1863  1864  1865  1866  1867  1868  1869
1870  1871  1872  1873  1874  1875  1876  1877  1878  1879
1880  1881  1882  1883  1884  1885  1886  1887  1888  1889
1890  1891  1892  1893  1894  1895  1896  1897  1898  1899

1700s in literature
1700  1701  1702  1703  1704  1705  1706  1707  1708  1709
1710  1711  1712  1713  1714  1715  1716  1717  1718  1719
1720  1721  1722  1723  1724  1725  1726  1727  1728  1729
1730  1731  1732  1733  1734  1735  1736  1737  1738  1739
1740  1741  1742  1743  1744  1745  1746  1747  1748  1749
1750  1751  1752  1753  1754  1755  1756  1757  1758  1759
1760  1761  1762  1763  1764  1765  1766  1767  1768  1769
1770  1771  1772  1773  1774  1775  1776  1777  1778  1779
1780  1781  1782  1783  1784  1785  1786  1787  1788  1789
1790  1791  1792  1793  1794  1795  1796  1797  1798  1799

1600s in literature
1600  1601  1602  1603  1604  1605  1606  1607  1608  1609
1610  1611  1612  1613  1614  1615  1616  1617  1618  1619
1620  1621  1622  1623  1624  1625  1626  1627  1628  1629
1630  1631  1632  1633  1634  1635  1636  1637  1638  1639
1640  1641  1642  1643  1644  1645  1646  1647  1648  1649
1650  1651  1652  1653  1654  1655  1656  1657  1658  1659
1660  1661  1662  1663  1664  1665  1666  1667  1668  1669
1670  1671  1672  1673  1674  1675  1676  1677  1678  1679
1680  1681  1682  1683  1684  1685  1686  1687  1688  1689
1690  1691  1692  1693  1694  1695  1696  1697  1698  1699

1500s in literature
1500  1501  1502  1503  1504  1505  1506  1507  1508  1509
1510  1511  1512  1513  1514  1515  1516  1517  1518  1519
1520  1521  1522  1523  1524  1525  1526  1527  1528  1529
1530  1531  1532  1533  1534  1535  1536  1537  1538  1539
1540  1541  1542  1543  1544  1545  1546  1547  1548  1549
1550  1551  1552  1553  1554  1555  1556  1557  1558  1559
1560  1561  1562  1563  1564  1565  1566  1567  1568  1569
1570  1571  1572  1573  1574  1575  1576  1577  1578  1579
1580  1581  1582  1583  1584  1585  1586  1587  1588  1589
1590  1591  1592  1593  1594  1595  1596  1597  1598  1599

1400s in literature
Redirect to:  15th century in literature.

Other years in literature 

Note, chronology of poetry before 1500 is resolved by decade and by century to earlier dates.
 14th century in literature · 13th century in literature
 12th century in literature · 11th century in literature
 10th century in literature · 9th century in literature
 Early Medieval literature, or 6th to 9th centuries in literature 
 Ancient literature, or literature through the 5th century

See also

 List of years in literature
 List of years in Australian literature
 List of years in philosophy

 
 
Tables of years